Aqua is the fourth studio album by British rock supergroup Asia, released in 1992. It was the first album with longtime vocalist and bassist John Payne.

Background
In April 1991, original vocalist and bassist John Wetton departed from Asia, discouraged by the group's lack of success in the United States. He was replaced by John Payne, who accepted an invitation from keyboard player Geoff Downes to join the group. This duo would eventually lead Asia through to 2006. Although being in an official capacity, two other co-founders, guitarist Steve Howe and drummer Carl Palmer, were involved sporadically, as Howe returned during the sessions having just left Yes again, and Palmer would leave soon, committing to a reunion of Emerson, Lake & Palmer. The line-up was completed by American guitarist Al Pitrelli, who collaborated with Alice Cooper from 1989 to 1991. Several additional musicians were invited as guests, including drummer Simon Phillips.

Production
Aqua was recorded at Advision Studios in Brighton, England, and produced by Downes. The cover artwork was designed by Rodney Matthews, known for his work with Eloy and Magnum among others, and featured the group's logotype designed by Roger Dean, who had created the covers of all previous studio recordings.

"Love Under Fire" was composed in summer 1988 by Downes and Greg Lake under the project named Ride the Tiger. The album contains four songs co-written by Johnny Warman.

Release
Aqua was released on 8 June 1992 in the United Kingdom by Musidisc and 15 September 1992 in the United States by Great Pyramid Records. The U.S. edition features a modified cover and different track listing, in which "Little Rich Boy" is omitted.

Track listing

 Tracks 15 and 16 were recorded on 10 November 1992 at the Town & Country Club in London.

Personnel

Asia
 Geoff Downes – keyboards, backing vocals; producer
 Steve Howe – acoustic and electric guitars, pedal steel guitar, Dobro guitar, mandolin
 Al Pitrelli – lead and rhythm guitars
 John Payne – bass guitar, guitar, lead vocals, backing vocals
 Carl Palmer – drums, percussion

Additional musicians
 Anthony Glynne – guitar
 Simon Phillips – drums
 Nigel Glockler – drums

Technical personnel
 Pete Craigie – engineer
 John Brand – mixing engineer
 Rodney Matthews – sleeve illustration
 Roger Dean – Asia logotype
 Brian Burrows – sleeve design/typography (European edition)
 Hugh Syme – design (U.S. edition)

Charts

References

Asia (band) albums
1992 albums
Albums produced by Geoff Downes
Albums with cover art by Rodney Matthews